Statistics of JSL Cup in the 1979 season.

Overview
It was contested by 20 teams, and Yomiuri won the championship.

Results

1st round
Yanmar Diesel 5-0 Toshiba Horikawa
Nippon Steel 2-1 Kofu
Mitsubishi Motors 2-1 Toyo Industries
Furukawa Electric 2-0 Nippon Kokan

2nd round
Yamaha Motors 3-1 Nissan Motors
Yanmar Diesel 1-2 Yomiuri
Toyota Motors 1-1 (PK 5–4) Nippon Steel
Teijin Matsuyama 1-2 Fujitsu
Fujita Industries 2-0 Sumitomo Metals
Mitsubishi Motors 1-0 Yanmar Club
Honda 0-1 Furukawa Electric
Hitachi 4-0 Tanabe Pharmaceuticals

Quarterfinals
Yamaha Motors 2-4 Yomiuri
Toyota Motors 1-2 Fujitsu
Fujita Industries 0-3 Mitsubishi Motors
Furukawa Electric 2-1 Hitachi

Semifinals
Yomiuri 3-3 (PK 4–3) Fujitsu
Mitsubishi Motors 2-2 (PK 5–4) Furukawa Electric

Final
Yomiuri 3-2 Furukawa Electric
Yomiuri won the championship

References
 

JSL Cup
League Cup